This is the videography of the South Korean girl group Girls' Generation. Girls' Generation have been in the music business ever since debuting in August 2007. The group is composed of eight members: Taeyeon, Sunny, Tiffany, Hyoyeon, Yuri, Sooyoung, Yoona and Seohyun. Former member Jessica was dismissed from the group in 2014.

Music videos

Commercial videos

Filmography

Film

Television

Drama

Reality series

Specials

See also
 Girls' Generation discography
 List of songs by Girls' Generation
 List of awards and nominations received by Girls' Generation
 List of Girls' Generation concert tours

References

External links

 Girls' Generation on YouTube

Videography
Videographies of South Korean artists